This is a list of countries sorted by the number of official languages. Only countries with three or more official languages, either nationally or locally, are included.

See also
 List of official languages by country and territory
 List of official languages
 List of largest languages without official status
 List of languages by the number of countries in which they are recognized as an official language

References